Bernadette Seacrest is an American vocalist born in San Francisco, California.

Career
In 2001 Seacrest began singing for The Long Goners, a Rockabilly band originating in Albuquerque, New Mexico that shared the stage with Hank Williams III, Big Sandy & His Fly-Rite Boys, Jonathan Richman and Bastard Sons of Johnny Cash.  Bernadette left The Long Goners to form Bernadette Seacrest and her Yes Men in 2003. The band released their debut album "No More Music by the Suckers" in 2004. After touring extensively throughout the United States and France the band released a second album in 2005 "Live in Santa Fe."

In 2006 Bernadette Seacrest relocated to Atlanta, Georgia to form Bernadette Seacrest and her Provocateurs with guitarist/songwriter Charles Williams of The Bonaventure Quartet and bassist Kris Dale of The Quark Alliance. In 2007 she was awarded the critic's pick Best Atlanta Vocalist in Atlanta's long established alternative press publication Creative Loafing. The new group released their debut album "The Filthy South Sessions" in December 2009. The album was well received in a number of published reviews and was followed by two more tours in France.

In 2016, “Lust and Madness” was released under the band name “Bernadette Seacrest & Kris Dale” on CD, digital and vinyl formats. The album includes duet performances with Francine Reed and Mike Geier, both of whom have made occasional guest performances at live shows. Musicians include Kris Dale, Marlon Patton, Noah Thomas and R L Martin. 

In 2021, “My Love Is” was released in digital format. A special edition 12” 45rpm vinyl features Seacrest on the cover in the titled work “Majorette” - created by surrealist photographer Joel-Peter Witkin in 2003. Musicians include – Kris Dale, Darren Stanley, Pat Bova. The track “Vampire” was written by former bandmate Pat Bova.

Discography

Main releases

 2021 – My Love Is – Bernadette Seacrest, Kris Dale & Darren Stanley (Independent)
 2016 – Lust and Madness – Bernadette Seacrest and Kris Dale (Independent)
 2009 – The Filthy South Sessions – Bernadette Seacrest and her Provocateurs (Independent)
 2005 – Live in Santa Fe – Bernadette Seacrest and her Yes Men (Independent)
 2004 – No More Music by the Suckers – Bernadette Seacrest and her Yes Men (ThrillBomb Records)

References 

Live Music Picks, Atlanta Journal and Constitution, January 8th, 2010
Bernadette Seacrest transcends the blues in life and song, Feature Article, Creative Loafing, January 4th, 2010
The Filthy South Sessions, record review, The Sunday Paper, January 3rd, 2010
The Filthy South Sessions, record review, Albuquerque Alibi, December 10th, 2009
Creative Loafing Archive, Best Atlanta Vocalist – critic's pick, September 7th, 2007
ABC Picks, Athens, GA Flagpole, April 4th, 2007
This Happy Accident, Feature Article, Tucson Weekly, May 12th, 2005
Nob Hill singer is unforgettable, Albuquerque Journal, May 7th, 2004
No More Music by the Suckers, record review, Ink 19, May 11th 2005
Singer goes from stage fright to stage finesse, Albuquerque Journal, December 10, 2004
Joel-Peter Witkin, “Majorette” New Mexico, 2003

Living people
American women singers
1965 births
Singers from San Francisco
21st-century American women
American women jazz singers
American jazz singers